The 1999 NCAA Women's Gymnastics championship involved 12 schools competing for the national championship of women's NCAA Division I gymnastics.  It was the eighteenth NCAA gymnastics national championship and the defending NCAA Team Champion for 1998 was Georgia.  The competition took place in Salt Lake City, Utah, hosted by the University of Utah in the Jon M. Huntsman Center. The 1999 Championship was won by defending champion Georgia.

Champions

Team Results

Session 1

Session 2

Super Six

External links
  Gym Results

NCAA Women's Gymnastics championship
1999 in women's gymnastics